Willème was a French truck manufacturer.

History

Willème was founded in 1923 by Louis Willeme, after working for Automobiles Grégoire.

Most were made with Deutz AG engines; some with in-house engines; some with AEC. In the 1960s, Willème also sold rebadged AEC and BMC trucks.
 
Willème went bankrupt in 1970 and were taken over by PRP (Perez et Raymond), who continued to produce Willème's TG range of trucks. Eventually, some MOL Trucks were based on Willème designs.

Some Willème heavy-haul trucks are still in service.

Products

Willème specialised in heavy haulage roadtractors and large lorries.

Early models
The DW12A was used as a tank transporter by the French army.

Post-war trucks: S10, L10, and R15
10- and 15-ton trucks, with Deutz engines, sold between 1945 and 1953.

610 and 615 series
Sold 1953-1963.

TL and LD series
Available with both AEC and Willème engines.
The AEC-engined 5741-CG was sold as an 8-wheel heavy wrecker.
Some models, such as the W8SA, were also built as oilfield trucks.
RD 6x4

Willème-PRP
W200, 8x4, 245 tonne gross weight.
The TG200 was an 8x4 heavy-hauler, capable of handling 200 ton loads.
TG250: 250 tonnes gross weight
The TG300 was 8x8 capable of hauling up to 1000 tonnes, powered by a Detroit Diesel V16. Some were built by Trabosa.

External links

Video of a restored Willeme TG200 ballast tractor

References

Truck manufacturers of France
Defunct motor vehicle manufacturers of France